The men's pole vault was one of four jumping events on the Athletics at the 1896 Summer Olympics programme. Five athletes competed in the pole vault. The two Americans far outclassed the three Greeks, starting higher than the Greeks could clear and taking first and second places. Damaskos and Theodoropoulos tied for third, while Xydas took fifth.

Background

This was the first appearance of the event, which is one of 12 athletics events to have been held at every Summer Olympics. Eighteen athletes entered, but only five started. The world record holder was Walter Rodenbaugh, but he was absent along with five-time AAA winner Richard Dickinson of Great Britain. Of the vaulters present, William Hoyt was the favorite on the basis of a third-place finish at the 1895 ICAAAA.

Competition format

There was a single round of vaulting. The bar started at 2.40 metres, increasing 10 centimetres at a time until 3.20 metres and then by 5 centimetres at a time.

Records

These were the standing world and Olympic records (in metres) prior to the 1896 Summer Olympics.

* unofficial

William Hoyt set the initial Olympic record at 3.30 metres.

Schedule

The exact time of the contest is not known; it was the fourth event of the afternoon session, following the 100 metres final, high jump, and 110 metres hurdles final. The pole vault took long enough that it was interrupted by the finish of the marathon.

Results

The three Greeks began with the bar at 2.40 metres. All three made that mark. The bar was then raised .10 metres at a time, eliminating Xydas after he failed the second jump and the other two after they failed the fourth height. The American pair did not jump at any of those heights, instead beginning at 2.80 metres, a height that gave neither any difficulty. Tyler was unable to clear the 3.30 metres height, and Hoyt failed at 3.40 metres only.

References

Sources
  (Digitally available at la84foundation.org)
  (Excerpt available at la84foundation.org)
 

Men's jump pole vault
Pole vault at the Olympics